The Bharatiya Janata Party (BJP) is one of the two major parties in the political system of the Republic of India, the other being the Indian National Congress (INC). , it is the country's largest political party in terms of representation in the national parliament. Established in 1980, the BJP's platform is generally considered as the right-wing of the political spectrum. , 49 BJP leaders have held the position of a chief minister and Deputy Chief Minister  out of which twelve and six are incumbent.

A chief minister is the head of government of each of the twenty-eight states and three union territories (UTs) (Delhi, Jammu and Kashmir and Puducherry). According to the Constitution of India, at the state-level, the governor is de jure head, but de facto executive authority rests with the chief minister. Following elections to the state legislative assembly, the governor usually invites the party (or coalition) with a majority of seats to form the government. The governor appoints the chief minister, whose council of ministers are collectively responsible to the assembly. The chief minister's term is usually for a maximum of five years, with the confidence of the assembly's confidence. There are no limits to the number of terms the chief minister can serve.Deputy Chief Minister is a member of the state government and usually the second highest ranking executive officer of their state's council of ministers. While not a constitutional office, it seldom carries any specific powers.[1] A deputy chief minister usually also holds a cabinet portfolio such as home minister or finance minister. In the parliamentary system of government, the Chief Minister is treated as the "first among equals" in the cabinet; the position of deputy chief minister is used to bring political stability and strength within a coalition government.

Of the 49 BJP chief ministers, twelve are incumbent — Pema Khandu in Arunachal Pradesh, Himanta Biswa Sarma in Assam, Pramod Sawant in Goa, Bhupendrabhai Patel in Gujarat, Manohar Lal Khattar in Haryana,  Basavaraj Bommai in Karnataka, Shivraj Singh Chouhan in Madhya Pradesh, N. Biren Singh in Manipur, Manik Saha in Tripura, Pushkar Singh Dhami in Uttarakhand, and Yogi Adityanath in Uttar Pradesh. Four of the BJP chief ministers have been women — Sushma Swaraj in Delhi, Uma Bharti in Madhya Pradesh, Anandiben Patel in Gujarat and Vasundhara Raje in Rajasthan. Shivraj Singh Chauhan, who is chief minister of Madhya Pradesh for more than 15 years has been the longest-serving chief minister from the BJP. Devendra Fadnavis's second tenure as the chief minister of Maharashtra lasted for only three days, which is the least tenure among chief ministers from BJP; however, taking the total of all the tenures into consideration, Sushma Swaraj served as a chief minister of Delhi for the shortest period of 52 days. Bhairon Singh Shekhawat of Rajasthan was the first chief minister from the BJP; however some BJP leaders had already been elected before as the chief minister while being a member of the Janata Party (JP), an amalgam of political parties which included BJP's predecessor Bharatiya Jana Sangh. There have been seven chief ministers in Uttarakhand from the BJP, six chief ministers in Gujarat, four chief ministers in Karnataka, Madhya Pradesh and Uttar Pradesh each, and three in Delhi, Goa, Himachal Pradesh and Jharkhand each.

Arunachal Pradesh
 
Key
 – Incumbent Chief Minister

Assam

Key
 – Incumbent Chief Minister

Chhattisgarh 

Key
 – Incumbent Chief Minister

Delhi 

Key
 – Incumbent Chief Minister

Goa

 
Key
 – Incumbent Chief Minister

Gujarat 

Key
 – Incumbent Chief Minister

Haryana 

 
Key
 – Incumbent Chief Minister

Himachal Pradesh

Jharkhand

Karnataka 

Key
 – Incumbent Chief Minister

Madhya Pradesh 

Key
 – Incumbent Chief Minister

Maharashtra 

Key
 – Incumbent Chief Minister

Manipur 

Key
 – Incumbent Chief Minister

Rajasthan 

Key
 – Incumbent Chief Minister

Tripura 
The Left Front government was defeated after 25 years of office out in 2018 election, with the Bharatiya Janata Party winning majority of seats and Biplab Kumar Deb becoming the first Chief Minister of Tripura from the Bharatiya Janata Party.

Key
 – Incumbent Chief Minister

Uttar Pradesh 

Key
 – Incumbent Chief Minister

Uttarakhand 

Key
 – Incumbent Chief Minister

See also

List of current Indian chief ministers
List of current Indian deputy chief ministers
List of longest-serving Indian chief ministers
List of female chief ministers in India
List of chief ministers from the Communist Party of India (Marxist)
List of chief ministers from the Indian National Congress

Notes

References
General

Specific

External links